Richmond CenterStage is a performing arts center in Richmond, Virginia, that includes the Altria Theatre and the theatre formerly known as the Carpenter Theatre Center for the Performing Arts.  The Carpenter Theatre was originally a Loew's Theatre movie palace developed by the Loew's Theatres company and designed by John Eberson. The building's construction began in 1927. Its doors opened in 1928. The Altria Theatre was constructed a year earlier, in 1926, and was originally a Shriners hall.

Geography
Still known too many Richmonders as the Carpenter Center, the main center stage structure occupies the 600 block of historic Grace Street, a one-way road traveling west through Richmond. In the Grace Street Commercial Historic District, it is bordered by Broad Street to the north, Seventh Street to the east, Grace Street to the south and Sixth street to the west. It is not in a City of Richmond Local Old & Historic District, but does now fall within the newly created Arts and Cultural District as designated by Richmond City Council.

The Altria Theater is on North Laurel Street in the heart of Virginia Commonwealth University's urban campus. The marquee faces Monroe Park with West Main Street and North Cherry Street bordering it on the south and west, respectively.

History
The prominent New York architect, John Eberson, conceived the design for the Loew's Theatre Corporation, influenced by both Moorish and Spanish baroque styles. Architectural historian Calder Loth states: "Loew's was considered the most up-to-date theater in the South when it opened on April 9, 1928". Eberson was famous for inventing the "atmospheric theatre" design, where the theater's walls resembled an elegant villa or streetscape under a night sky. The Carpenter Theatre design evokes a Spanish setting, with a faux sky ceiling containing stars and moving clouds.

The Altria Theater was constructed in 1926 to be used by the Shriners as the Acca Temple Shrine. It was designed in 1925 in the Moorish Revival style by Marcellus E. Wright Sr. in association with Charles M. Robinson and Charles Custer Robinson, and was completed in 1926.

The Richmond CenterStage complex was renamed Dominion Energy Center in 2015. The Richmond CenterStage Foundation has been re-branded as the Richmond Performing Arts Alliance.

Current use
The facility and organization, once known as the Carpenter Center for the Performing Arts, merged with the Virginia Performing Arts Foundation in the early 2000s.  After a major fundraising and advocacy campaign, and a private-public partnership with the City of Richmond, the Thalhimers Department Store, adjacent to the Carpenter Center, was purchased as part of the strategic plan to create the envisioned performing arts center. When construction was complete, the complex was renamed Richmond CenterStage and expanded to include the Altria Theater.

The center now contains five venues in two distinct locations. The Carpenter Theatre, named for the E. Rhodes and Leona B. Carpenter Foundation, is the historic 1,800-seat proscenium theater described above. Dorothy Pauley Square, a newer four-story building attached to the Carpenter Theatre, contains three venues: Libby S. Gottwald Playhouse, a 200-seat flexible playhouse; Rhythm Hall, a jazz / cabaret space; and Showcase Gallery, a reception area and gallery for the visual arts. The Altria Theater, a 3,600 seat performance hall, is the fifth venue, a mile west of the Carpenter / Dorothy Pauley Square location.

The third and fourth floors of Dorothy Pauley Square contain office space currently occupied by the staffs of CenterStage, Richmond Symphony and Virginia Opera. The third floor also contains the Genworth Bright Lights Education Center, classroom and educational space used for CenterStage's and other arts groups' educational programming. The Digital Arts Learning Center is a state-of-the-art digital media center within the Bright Lights space.

CenterStage officially opened to the public on September 12th, 2009, after a large capital campaign, a controversial public-private partnership with the City of Richmond, and a decision to resize the project from a much larger proposed one. Additionally controversial is the organizational structure of the complex that has SMG Richmond, a for-profit corporation based out of Pennsylvania, operating the venues via a City-appointed Board of local executives.

CenterStage currently has nine Resident Companies who use CenterStage for performances and educational programming. African American Repertory Theatre, Elegba Folklore Society, Richmond Ballet, Richmond Jazz Society, Henley Street Theatre / Richmond Shakespeare, Richmond Symphony, SPARC (School of the Performing Arts in the Richmond Community), Virginia Repertory Theatre and Virginia Opera. The facility has the capacity to hold smaller groups for local and regional performances, as well as very large audiences for national touring acts.

The Altria Theater is currently a very popular venue, hosting the Richmond Forum, the Broadway in Richmond Series, and a number of other headliner musical and comedy acts. In 2012, Richmond City Council authorized an allocation of $14M to contribute to the renovation and restoration of the Landmark. The complete project is a nearly $60M renovation and should take approximately 3 years to complete.

Most recently, Richmond CenterStage celebrated its 2nd birthday with a Gala Celebration featuring Patti La Belle, and its 4th year with a gala featuring Emily Skinner in June 2013.  Richmond CenterStage continues to pursue its mission to be a catalyst for the arts in Richmond and become part of the city's economic and cultural revitalization.

References

External links

Theatres on the National Register of Historic Places in Virginia
Theatres in Richmond, Virginia
National Register of Historic Places in Richmond, Virginia
Theatres completed in 1928
1928 establishments in Virginia
Loew's Theatres buildings and structures
Individually listed contributing properties to historic districts on the National Register in Virginia
John Eberson buildings
Atmospheric theatres
Public venues with a theatre organ